Simon Timothy Gordon Smith is a former footballer who previously worked as the head goalkeeping coach for Newcastle United.

Biography

Playing career
Smith began his professional career with Newcastle United in 1978, spending four years there before moving on to Whitley Bay and then Gateshead, where he played 501 games, including a run of 405 games in a row, over a ten-year period. He also signed as a non-contract player for Carlisle United, Sunderland and again Newcastle United.

Coaching career
Smith returned to Newcastle United in 1993 as a goalkeeping coach, working firstly at the Centre of Excellence and latterly as Academy goalkeeping coach working with goalkeepers from the age of 8–19.

In the summer of 1999, Smith became first-team goalkeeping coach working under Ruud Gullit and Sir Bobby Robson. He was Sir Bobby Robson's goalkeeping coach over a five-year period, coaching in the Premier League with goalkeepers Shay Given, Steve Harper, Lionel Perez, John Karelse and Tony Caig.

On 16 September 2004 Smith handed in his resignation and left the club. He was replaced by Roy Tunks.

Smith has since worked for the Football Association as the goalkeeping coach to the England under-19 and under-17 teams and as a goalkeeping scout identifying and reporting on current and possible England goalkeepers. He has also worked as goalkeeping coach to the women's national football team.

After successfully completing a B.A. Sports studies degree in 1995, Smith also set up his own goalkeeping coaching company, Simon Smith Goalkeeping. In 2005, Simon Smith Goalkeeping joined forces with Bobby Charlton Soccer and Sports Academy to provide a specialist coaching programme and specialist staff.

In 2006 Smith moved to Vancouver to undertake a year-long secondment to research the biomechanics of goalkeeping, during which time he worked as a consultant to the Canadian Soccer Association, working with the senior and under-20 national soccer team. He also worked in the MLS with Frank Yallop at the LA Galaxy, working with goalkeepers Steve Cronin and Kevin Hartman.

On 17 July 2007 Smith joined Carlisle United as a part-time goalkeeping coach. On 5 August 2008 he was replaced by Dave Timmins because the club wasn't satisfied with his only part-time involvement at the team.

Smith rejoined Newcastle in 2015 as the club's Head of Goalkeeping. He left the club in July 2022 saying "It has been a great privilege to work for Newcastle United Football Club and I have hugely enjoyed the many opportunities I've had to work with our first team goalkeepers throughout the years. I will continue watching and supporting the team and wish them every success for the future as I look forward to new challenges ahead."

References

External links
Profile at simonsmithgoalkeeping.com
Profile at thegoalkeepingcoach.com

1962 births
Living people
People from Newton Aycliffe
Footballers from County Durham
English footballers
Association football goalkeepers
Newcastle United F.C. players
Whitley Bay F.C. players
Gateshead F.C. players
Carlisle United F.C. players
Sunderland A.F.C. players
National League (English football) players
Northern Premier League players
Newcastle United F.C. non-playing staff
Carlisle United F.C. non-playing staff
Association football goalkeeping coaches